Cynodon nlemfuensis, the African Bermuda-grass, is a species of grass, genus Cynodon, family Poaceae. It is native to Tropical Africa except West Africa, and widely introduced as a forage elsewhere; Hawaii, Texas, Florida, Mexico, Central America, the Caribbean, the Galápagos, South America, western and southern Africa, Saudi Arabia, Taiwan, the Philippines and Australia. It is stoloniferous, and not rhizomatous.

Subtaxa
The following varieties are accepted:
Cynodon nlemfuensis var. nlemfuensis
Cynodon nlemfuensis var. robustus Clayton & J.R.Harlan

References

Chloridoideae
Forages
Flora of Northeast Tropical Africa
Flora of the Democratic Republic of the Congo
Flora of Rwanda
Flora of Burundi
Flora of East Tropical Africa
Flora of South Tropical Africa
Plants described in 1922